West Englewood may refer to:

West Englewood, Chicago, Illinois, United States
West Englewood, New Jersey, United States